Odontoloxozus longicornis, the longhorn cactus fly, is a species of cactus flies (insects in the family Neriidae).

Distribution
Mexico, Costa Rica.

References

Neriidae
Insects described in 1904
Taxa named by Daniel William Coquillett
Diptera of North America